A by-election for the seat of Davenport in the South Australian House of Assembly was held on 31 January 2015. The by-election was triggered by the resignation of Liberal Party of Australia MP and former Liberal leader Iain Evans, who retained the seat at the 2014 election on a 58.1 (−2.8) percent two-party-preferred vote. Liberal Sam Duluk went on to win the seat despite a five-point two-party swing, turning the historically safe seat of Davenport in to a marginal for the first time.

The by-election was held on the same day as the 2015 Queensland state election.

Dates

Candidates

Result

Liberal Sam Duluk won the seat with a -4.1 point swing, with the Liberal party failing to win outright and relying on preferences. South Australian Newspoll at the time of the Davenport by-election recorded a statewide seven percent two-party swing from Liberal to Labor. ABC election analyst Antony Green described the Davenport by-election as "another poor result for the South Australian Liberal Party" following the 2014 Fisher by-election which saw Labor go from minority to majority government following a 7.3 percent two-party swing. As with the Fisher by-election, much of the anti-Liberal swing was attributed to the unpopularity of then Prime Minister Tony Abbott, and a remark from then Defence Minister David Johnston several days before the Fisher by-election that he wouldn't trust South Australia's Australian Submarine Corporation to "build a canoe". Additionally, just a couple of days before the Davenport by-election, Abbott's infamous knighting of Prince Philip occurred.

See also
2014 Fisher state by-election
2018 South Australian state election#Polling
List of South Australian House of Assembly by-elections
Electoral results for the district of Davenport

References

External links
2015 Davenport By-election: Antony Green ABC
2015 Davenport By-election: ECSA
How-To-Vote (HTV) cards, 2015 Davenport By-election: ECSA

2015 elections in Australia
South Australian state by-elections
2010s in South Australia